Swamp Creek is a stream in the U.S. states of Florida and Georgia. It is a tributary to Attapulgus Creek.

Swamp Creek was named for the wetlands near its course.

References

Rivers of Georgia (U.S. state)
Rivers of Decatur County, Georgia
Rivers of Grady County, Georgia
Rivers of Florida
Rivers of Gadsden County, Florida